Francesco Mandragona (born 27 September 1962) is an Italian sprint canoer who competed in the mid to late 1980s. Competing in two Summer Olympics, he earned his best finish of seventh in the K-4 1000 m event at Seoul in 1988.

References

1962 births
Canoeists at the 1984 Summer Olympics
Canoeists at the 1988 Summer Olympics
Italian male canoeists
Living people
Olympic canoeists of Italy
20th-century Italian people